Business Is Business may refer to:
 Business is business, a French comedy play by Octave Mirbeau.
Business Is Business (album), 1996 rap album by PMD
Business Is Business (1915 film), a 1915 American silent film
Business Is Business (film), a 1971 comedy movie directed by Paul Verhoeven